Feigenbaum Bergeron Richardson syndrome, also known as Atherosclerosis-deafness-diabetes-epilepsy-nephropathy syndrome is a very rare fatal genetic disorder which is characterized by atherosclerosis, hearing loss, diabetes mellitus, epilepsy, progressive neurological deterioration and nephropathy. This disorder has been described in two brothers, and it is thought to be inherited in either an autosomal or X-linked recessive manner. No new cases have been reported since 1994. People with this disorder don't usually live beyond 30 to 40 years of age.

References 

Genetic diseases and disorders